Francis W. Wilson (1870 - 1947) was an American architect.  His practice in Santa Barbara, California included work for the Atchison, Topeka and Santa Fe Railway and its associated Fred Harvey Company hotels, as well as many residences.

Life and career  
Wilson was born in Massachusetts and arrived in California at the age of 17 to visit his sister, a schoolteacher in Placerville. There, he worked as a log-driver on the American River and then as a surveyor for the Southern Pacific Railroad. He moved to San Francisco in the early 1890s, becoming a draftsman for the firm of Pissis and Moore, where he was instructed by architect Albert Pissis. Wilson studied at the San Francisco chapter of the American Institute of Architects and took a grand tour of Europe before establishing his own firm in Santa Barbara in 1895.

Shortly after arriving in Santa Barbara, Wilson designed homes for Dr. C.C. Park and General Henry J. Strong. He built up a practice designing homes for the wealthy, as well as designing, building and selling speculative houses. His connections with the wealthy led to an interest in polo and amateur horse racing, and to commissions for the Santa Barbara Club, the Central Savings Bank, the Santa Barbara library, post office, and railroad station. A friendship with Edward Payson Ripley, president of the Santa Fe Railway, led to commissions for the railway and for the Fred Harvey Company, as well as a commission to design Ripley's winter home. His most extravagant residential commission, Las Tejas in the suburb of Montecito, was built in 1917 for Oakleigh Thorne.

Wilson married Julia Redington, sister of Wilson's friend and fellow Santa Barbara Polo Club member Lawrence Redington, in 1905.

In 1920, Wilson purchased a forty-five acre ranch in Tuolumne County, California, as well as a nearby mining company. Shortly thereafter, he divorced Redington. During the 1930s, Wilson designed several houses in or near Sonoma, California. During World War II, he took a position as a designer for at Lockheed Aircraft's plant in Burbank, California.

Works
 Charles H. Hopkins Home ("El Nido") (1897), Santa Barbara, California
 Santa Barbara Club (1903), Santa Barbara, California
 Bellosguardo (1904), the Graham home in Santa Barbara, California, demolished 1933 and replaced by a new Bellosguardo, the estate of [William A. Clark].
 Santa Barbara Railway Station (1905), Santa Barbara, California, commissioned by Southern Pacific Railroad, listed on the NRHP
 Alexander House, Santa Barbara, California (1906)
 Peter H. Murphy Home ("El Tejado") (1907), Santa Barbara, California, now Kerrwood Hall, Westmont College
 Potter Theater (1907), Santa Barbara, California, destroyed in 1925 earthquake
 El Garces Hotel (1908), a Harvey House hotel in Needles, California, listed on the NRHP
 Seth Cook Rees Home (1908), Pasadena, California
 Santa Barbara Country Club ("Miraflores") (1909), Santa Barbara, California, rebuilt 1913, altered 1915 by Reginald D. Johnson) now the Music Academy of the West
 Bright Angel Camp (1909), Grand Canyon, Arizona, a conversion of the Bright Angel Hotel and the Buckey O'Neill Cabin for the Fred Harvey Company, now part of the Bright Angel Lodge complex designed by Mary Colter
 Grand Canyon Depot (1910), Arizona, a National Historic Landmark
 Barstow Train Depot ("Casa del Desierto") (1911), a Harvey House located at 685 North First Street, Barstow, California
 Central Savings Bank (1913), Corner of State and de la Guerre, Santa Barbara, California, destroyed in 1925 earthquake
 Santa Barbara Post Office (1914), Santa Barbara, California, now the Santa Barbara Museum of Art (with Oscar Wenderoth, Office of the Supervising Architect), remodeled 1941 by David Adler
 Santa Barbara Public Library (1917), Santa Barbara, California
 Oakleigh Thorne House ("Las Tejas") (1917), Montecito, California, redesign/remodel of estate originally built in 1868)

Gallery

References

External links
 Grand Canyon Depot, Architecture in the Parks, A National Historic Landmark Theme Study

1870 births
1947 deaths
Architects from California
People from Santa Barbara, California
Fred Harvey Company
American railway architects